Captain China is a 1950 American adventure film directed by Lewis R. Foster and written by Lewis R. Foster and Gwen Bagni. The film stars John Payne, Gail Russell, Jeffrey Lynn, Lon Chaney Jr., Edgar Bergen, Michael O'Shea and Ellen Corby. The film was released on February 2, 1950, by Paramount Pictures.

Plot

Cast 
John Payne as Charles S. Chinnough / Capt. China
Gail Russell as Kim Mitchell
Jeffrey Lynn as Capt. George Brendensen
Lon Chaney Jr. as Red Lynch
Edgar Bergen as Mr. Haasvelt
Michael O'Shea as Trask
Ellen Corby as Miss Endicott
Robert Armstrong as Keegan
John Qualen as Geech
Ilka Grüning as Mrs. Haasvelt
Keith Richards as Alberts
John Bagni as Sparks
Ray Hyke as Michaels
Paul Hogan as Speer
Lawrence Tibbett Jr. as Wilkes
Zon Murray as Gus 
Don Gazzaniga as Tony
Denver Pyle as Steve
Wallace Scott as Scotty 
Lee Roberts as Marsh
Reed Howes as Blake
Charles Regan as Wade

Production
Pine-Thomas had just made El Paso with John Payne and cast him in the lead for this in January 1949.

References

External links 
 

1950 films
Paramount Pictures films
American adventure films
1950 adventure films
Films directed by Lewis R. Foster
Seafaring films
American black-and-white films
1950s English-language films
1950s American films